The Keystone XLB-3 (originally built under the Huff-Daland name) was a prototype bomber biplane developed in the United States in the late 1920s. It was a twin-engine development of the single-engine LB-1, brought about by a change in policy by the United States Army Air Corps (USAAC).

Design and development
The shift from a nose-mounted engine to engines mounted in nacelles on the lower wing created an opportunity to provide stations for two extra crewmembers: a bombardier and a nose-gunner, bringing the total to five. The LB-1's single tailfin and rudder was augmented by an extra rudder either side of it.

Operational history
A single prototype was constructed, and delivered to the USAAC for evaluation at the end of 1927. Evaluation, however, showed that performance was actually inferior to that of the single-engine LB-1. The decision was taken to change the XLB-3's air-cooled inverted Liberty engines for air-cooled radials, at which point it was redesignated XLB-3A. With performance still unsatisfactory, development was abandoned in favor of a parallel design, the LB-5.

Variants
 XLB-3 – original version with Allison VG-1410 air-cooled inverted V-12 engines (1 built)
 XLB-3A – version with Pratt & Whitney R-1340 radial engines (1 converted from XLB-3)

Specifications (XLB-3A)

References

Notes

Bibliography

 Taylor, Michael J. H. Jane's Encyclopedia of Aviation. London: Studio Editions, 1989. 
 World Aircraft Information Files. London: Bright Star Publishing, File 899, Sheet 09.

External links

 National Museum of the USAF XLB-3 fact sheet
 National Museum of the USAF XLB-3A fact sheet
 American Bombing Aircraft

Biplanes
Huff-Daland aircraft
Light bombers
LB-3
Keystone LB-3
Aircraft first flown in 1927
Twin piston-engined tractor aircraft